Vincenc Makovský (3 June 1900 – 28 December 1966) was an avant-garde Czech sculptor and industrial designer. He was born in Nové Město na Moravě and died in Brno. He was a founding member of the Prague surrealist group, but was not active with the group for long. He founded the School of Arts in Zlín in 1940. In 1941 he designed the first Czech radial drilling machine, known as the VR8.

References

External links

Biography

1900 births
1966 deaths
Czech sculptors
Czech male sculptors
Czech industrial designers
20th-century sculptors
19th-century sculptors
People from Nové Město na Moravě